Bruno Gomes da Silva Clevelário  (born 4 April 2001), commonly known as Bruno Gomes, is a Brazilian footballer who plays as a centre midfielder for Coritiba.

Career statistics

Club

Notes

References

External links

2001 births
Living people
Brazilian footballers
Association football midfielders
Campeonato Brasileiro Série A players
Campeonato Brasileiro Série B players
CR Vasco da Gama players
Sport Club Internacional players
Coritiba Foot Ball Club players
Footballers from Rio de Janeiro (city)